Cold as Life is an American hardcore punk band based out of Detroit, Michigan, formed in 1988. Lyrical themes consisted of brutal depictions of the horrors of growing up and living in a city plagued with corruption, murder, drugs, depression and poverty, along with the tragedy of losing friends, family and bandmates to murder and drug abuse. Their shows were frequently violent, involving vicious fights that often included stabbings and beatings with various weapons. However, cold as life has a large "family" based following. Stories of these shows would spread throughout the Midwest punk and hardcore communities, contributing to the band's notoriety. Cold as Life drew musical influence from such bands as Negative Approach, Sheer Terror, Discharge, 4 Skins, Cro-Mags, Black Sabbath and Slayer.

In early 2007, a reunion tour was organized by former members but featured Enzo D and Jake Bulldog (of fellow Detroit band Dogz of War) on vocals and Guitar instead of co-founder Jeff Gunnells.

On June 4, 2013, Jeff Gunnells was sentenced to between 10 and 20 years in prison for armed robbery. Cold as Life reformed once again in 2015 and have played sporadically since.

Discography

Studio albums 
1998: Born to Land Hard (CTYC Productions, +/- Records)
2000: Declination of Independence (CTYC Productions)

Splits 
2001: Split with Ringworm (Stillborn Records)

Demos 
1989: 1989 Demo
1991: 1991 Demo
1992: 1992 Demo
1995: 1995 Demo
1997: 1997 Demo

Compilation albums 
2004: 1988–1993 (CTYC Productions)

Non-album tracks 
1996: Detroit Is Distraught Compilation 1996 – "How Much Longer"
1997: Feisty Cadavers and the Brotherhood (Idol Records) – "Live Like Vampires"
1999: Only the Strong Survive: 1999 (Victory Records) – "My Own Worst Enemy"
1999: The Spirit Lives On: A Tribute to Raybeez and Warzone (Hate Core Records) – "Fight the Opressor"
2007: United States of Hardcore (Hate Core Records) – "Pete's Sake (S.O.I.A.)"

See also 
 Music of Detroit#Hardcore punk

References

External links 
Cold As Life – MySpace profile
LIVE @ the Magic Stick in Detroit 31 October 1998

Musical groups from Detroit
Hardcore punk groups from Michigan
Musical groups established in 1988
Musical groups disestablished in 2001
Musical groups reestablished in 2015
1988 establishments in Michigan
Demons Run Amok Entertainment artists